DSRV-1 Mystic is a deep-submergence rescue vehicle that is rated to dive up to 5,000 feet (1,500 m). It was built by Lockheed for the US Navy at a construction cost of $41 million and launched 24 January 1970. It was declared fully operational in 1977 and named Mystic.

It was stationed at Naval Air Station North Island in San Diego and was never required to conduct an actual rescue operation. Mystic was replaced by the SRDRS on September 30, 2008 and began deactivation on October 1, 2008. In October 2014, the submarine was donated to the Naval Undersea Museum.

See also

Awards
 Meritorious Unit Citation with 3 stars (4 awards)
 Navy E Ribbon (3 awards)
 National Defense Service Medal with star (2 awards)

References

External links
 NavSource Online: Submarine Photo Archive Mystic (DSRV-1)
 USN Factfile DSRV 1 & 2
 Liewer, Steve, "Goodbye To Mystic Minisub, Hello To Falcon", San Diego Union-Tribune, March 6, 2009.

 

Mystic-class deep-submergence rescue vehicles
Cold War submarines of the United States
Ships built in the San Francisco Bay Area
1970 ships
Lockheed Corporation